Zinc finger and BTB domain-containing protein 21 is a protein that in humans is encoded by the ZBTB21 gene.

References

Further reading

External links 
 

Transcription factors